General Council elections were held in French Cameroons on 22 December 1946.

Electoral system
At the time of the election, the General Council had 40 seats, of which 16 were elected by the first college and 24 were elected by the second college.

Campaign
Only around 40 candidates contested the 40 seats.

Results
Of the 2,611 voters in the first college, 1,201 cast votes, whilst in the second college, 20,490 of the 38,976 registered voters voted.

References

1946 elections in Africa
Elections in Cameroon
1946 in French Cameroon
Election and referendum articles with incomplete results